Richard Dennis Hanley  (born February 19, 1936) is an American former competition swimmer, Olympic medalist, and former world record-holder.  At the 1956 Summer Olympics in Melbourne, Australia, he received a silver medal for swimming the lead-off leg for the runner-up U.S. team in the men's 4×200-meter freestyle relay.

Hanley attended the University of Michigan, where he was a varsity swimmer for the Michigan Wolverines swimming and diving team in National Collegiate Athletic Association (NCAA) competition from 1957 to 1959.  He was a member of the Michigan Wolverines' NCAA national championship teams in the 400-yard medley relay in 1957 and 1959 and the 400-yard freestyle relay in 1959, and he also won an individual NCAA national championship in the 200-yard freestyle in 1959.

See also
 List of Olympic medalists in swimming (men)
 List of University of Michigan alumni
 World record progression 200 metres freestyle

References

External links
 

1936 births
Living people
American male freestyle swimmers
World record setters in swimming
Michigan Wolverines men's swimmers
Olympic silver medalists for the United States in swimming
Sportspeople from Evanston, Illinois
Swimmers at the 1956 Summer Olympics
Medalists at the 1956 Summer Olympics